Alfriston School is a girls' special school in Beaconsfield, Buckinghamshire. In March 2012 the school became an Academy. It takes girls from the age of 11 through to the age of 18 and has approximately 125 pupils.

The school caters for girls with moderate learning difficulties and other special educational needs such as emotional and behavioural difficulties. The school takes girls as weekly boarders (i.e. Monday to Friday) and as day pupils.

Alfriston School is one of several Buckinghamshire schools which host mobile phone masts. Contracts between Buckinghamshire County Council and various mobile phone operators generate an income of £145,000 per annum, of which about £59,000 comes from contracts for masts that are installed in schools.

References

External links
Ofsted Reports
Department for Education Performance Tables 2011

Special schools in Buckinghamshire
Academies in Buckinghamshire
Girls' schools in Buckinghamshire
Special secondary schools in England
Beaconsfield